Josef Černý (born 11 May 1993) is a Czech professional racing cyclist, who currently rides for UCI WorldTeam . In May 2019, he was named in the startlist for the 2019 Giro d'Italia.

Major results

2011
 9th Trofeo Emilio Paganessi
2012
 1st Mountains classification, Carpathian Couriers Race
 6th Overall Dookoła Mazowsza
 10th Overall Tour of Małopolska
2013
 1st  Time trial, National Under-23 Road Championships
 1st  Young rider classification, Dookoła Mazowsza
 5th Memoriał Henryka Łasaka
2014
 1st GP Czech Republic
2015
 1st  Time trial, National Under-23 Road Championships
 5th Time trial, National Road Championships
2016
 5th Time trial, National Road Championships
2017
 1st  Overall Czech Cycling Tour
1st Stages 1 (TTT) & 3
 1st  Overall Okolo Jižních Čech
1st  Points classification
 National Road Championships
2nd Road race
3rd Time trial
 2nd Kerékpárverseny
 3rd GP Czech Republic
 3rd Szlakiem Wielkich Jezior
 5th GP Polski
 7th Overall Course de la Solidarité Olympique
 8th Memoriał Romana Siemińskiego
 10th Overall Okolo Slovenska
2018
 National Road Championships
1st  Road race
1st  Time trial
 2nd Overall À travers les Hauts-de-France
 2nd Overall Szlakiem Grodów Piastowskich
 3rd Overall Tour du Loir-et-Cher
 3rd Overall Ronde de l'Oise
 5th Overall Okolo Slovenska
 5th Overall Szlakiem Walk Majora Hubala
 5th Overall Okolo Jižních Čech
 7th Overall Tour of Slovenia
 8th GP Slovakia
 10th Overall Dookoła Mazowsza
2019
 2nd Time trial, National Road Championships
2020
 1st  Time trial, National Road Championships
 1st Stage 19 Giro d'Italia
 2nd Overall Tour Poitou-Charentes en Nouvelle-Aquitaine
1st Stage 3b (ITT)
 2nd Overall Vuelta a Murcia
2021
 1st  Time trial, National Road Championships
 4th Münsterland Giro
2022
 1st  Overall Okolo Slovenska
 1st Stage 5 Settimana Internazionale di Coppi e Bartali
2023
 1st Stage 2 (TTT) UAE Tour

Grand Tour general classification results timeline

References

External links
 

1993 births
Living people
Czech male cyclists
People from Frýdek-Místek
European Games competitors for the Czech Republic
Cyclists at the 2015 European Games
Czech Giro d'Italia stage winners
Sportspeople from the Moravian-Silesian Region